Waldemar Mota da Fonseca (18 March 1906 – April 1966), known as Valdemar Mota, was a Portuguese footballer who played as a midfielder and forward for FC Porto. He was born in Porto.

International career 
Valdemar Mota played 21 games and scored 4 goals for the Portugal national team. He made his debut 8 January 1928 in a 2–2 draw against Spain, and was playing for Portugal in the 1928 Football Olympic Tournament. He scored 1 goal in Portugal's first game against Chile in a 4–2 victory in Amsterdam.

References

External links 
Profile of Valdemar Mota (In Portuguese)
Valdemar Mota International Matches for Portugal

1906 births
1966 deaths
Portuguese footballers
FC Porto players
Portugal international footballers
Olympic footballers of Portugal
Footballers at the 1928 Summer Olympics
Footballers from Porto
Association football midfielders
Portuguese people of African descent